Unloved is the second studio album by Scottish band Frontierer. On 27 July 2018, it was released independently through the group's Bandcamp account. The album drew critical attention for its harshness and unrelenting tone. Unloved was preceded by the digital singles titled, "Tumoric" and "Glitcher" in May and June respectively.

Critical reception

Joe Smith-Engelhardt of Exclaim! praised Unloved's aggression and "masterfully" executed breakdowns, writing, "If you're a fan of brutal beatdown riffs and demented experimental metal with a hardcore touch, Unloved is a necessary listen". Rolling Stone's Christopher R. Weingarten also lauded the album's unrelenting harshness, describing it positively as "a hailstorm where time-signature confusion meets shrill noise-rock affects". Metal Storm wrote that the aggression of the album was admirable, but criticized the running time for being too long and ultimately, unsustainable. Daniel Cordova of Metal Injection wrote, "This album is nothing but breakdowns and chaos. It features some of the most fascinating and abrasive sounds I've heard on a record in a long, long time. The sounds on this hurt my brain almost as much as the band's name hurts my mouth to say."

Accolades

Track listing
All music written, composed, and produced by Frontierer

Personnel
Credits adapted from Unloved liner notes

Frontierer
 Pedram Valiani – guitars, production, writing, recording, mixing
 Chad Kapper – vocals
 Owen Hughes – drums
 Dan Stevenson – guitars
 Calum Craig – bass

Additional personnel
 Brad Boatright – mastering
 Meld – design
 Justine Jones – additional performance
 Sammy Urwin – additional performance
 Michael Dafferner – additional performance
 Greg Kubacki – additional performance

References

2018 albums